Satyakam Anand (born 11 July 1977) is an Indian actor, known for working in Bollywood and Bhojpuri films. He made his debut with the film, Dvandva (2009). Later, he appeared in films like Gangs of Wasseypur (2012) and Shorts (2013). In 2020, he appeared in a TV show called "Mere Sai".

Early life
Satyakam was born in a small town Arrah in Bihar. At the age of 19, he started theatre and took part in almost all major drama/theatre competitions that were conducted all over North India.

References

External links
 

1977 births
Living people
Indian male film actors
21st-century Indian male actors